Podophyllum peltatum is an herbaceous perennial plant in the family Berberidaceae. Its common names are mayapple, American mandrake, wild mandrake, and ground lemon. It is widespread across most of the eastern United States and southeastern Canada.

Mayapples are woodland plants, typically growing in colonies derived from a single root. The stems grow to 30–40 cm (12 in to 16 in) tall, with palmately lobed umbrella-like leaves up to 20–40  cm (8 in to 16 in) diameter with 3–9 shallowly to deeply cut lobes. The plants produce several stems from a creeping underground rhizome; some stems bear a single leaf and do not produce any flower or fruit, while flowering stems produce a pair or more leaves with 1–8 flowers in the axil between the apical leaves. The flowers are white, yellow or red, 2–6 cm (1" to 2") diameter with 6–9 petals, and mature into a green, yellow or red fleshy fruit 2–5 cm (1 in to 2 in) long.

All the parts of the plant are poisonous, including the green fruit, but once the fruit has turned yellow, it can be safely eaten . The ripe fruit does not produce toxicity.

The substance they contain (podophyllotoxin or podophyllin) is used as a purgative and as a cytostatic. Posalfilin is a drug containing podophyllin and salicylic acid that is used to treat the plantar wart. Podophyllotoxin  is highly toxic if consumed.

They are also grown as ornamental plants for their attractive foliage and flowers, and they are a larval host for the golden borer moth and the may apple borer.

Though the common name is mayapple, in some areas it is the flower that appears in early May, not the "apple". The fruit or "apple" is usually produced early in summer and ripens later in summer.

Many species of plants have mycorrhizae to assist with nutrient uptake in infertile conditions. Mayapple plants are considered obligately dependent upon such mycorrhizae, although it may also be facultatively dependent upon rhizome age and soil nutrient levels.  Plants are commonly found infected by the rust Allodus podophylli, appearing as honeycomb-patterned orange colonies under the leaves, and yellowish lesions on the upper surface.

Toxicity and use
The unripe green fruit is toxic. The ripened yellow fruit is edible in small amounts, and sometimes made into jelly, though when consumed in large amounts the fruit is poisonous. The rhizome, foliage, and roots are also poisonous.  Mayapple contains podophyllotoxin, which is highly toxic if consumed, but can be used as a topical medicine.

Mayapple has been used by American Indians as an emetic, cathartic, and antihelmintic agent. The rhizome of the mayapple has been used for a variety of medicinal purposes, originally by indigenous inhabitants and later by other settlers.

Mayapple can be also used topically as an escharotic in removing warts, and two of its derivatives, etoposide and teniposide, have shown promise in treating some cancers. Etoposide is among the World Health Organisations's list of essential medicines and it is derived from podophyllotoxin.

Gallery

References

External links

Berberidaceae
Flora of Eastern Canada
Flora of the Eastern United States
Flora of the Appalachian Mountains
Flora of the Great Lakes region (North America)
Plants used in traditional Native American medicine
Taxa named by Carl Linnaeus